Credit spread may refer to:

Credit spread (option)
Credit spread (bond)